Bohdanovce nad Trnavou is a municipality of Trnava District in the Trnava region of Slovakia.

Genealogical resources

The records for genealogical research are available at the state archive "Statny Archiv in Bratislava, Slovakia"

 Roman Catholic church records (births/marriages/deaths): 1694-1900 (parish A)
 Lutheran church records (births/marriages/deaths): 1666-1895 (parish B)

See also
 List of municipalities and towns in Slovakia

References

External links
https://web.archive.org/web/20071116010355/http://www.statistics.sk/mosmis/eng/run.html
Surnames of living people in Bohdanovce nad Trnavou

Villages and municipalities in Trnava District